Jos University Teaching Hospital (JUTH) is a Federal Tertiary Health Institution of Nigeria, established in 1975 and located in Jos, Plateau State. The acting chief medical director is Bupwatda Pokop Wushipba.

History 
Jos University Teaching Hospital was established in 1975. It was established during the regime of Gen. Yakubu Gowon but was commissioned in 1977 during the regime of Gen. Olusegun Obasanjo. In 2001, Bill & Melinda Gates Foundation partnered with JUTH to establish a laboratory to combat HIV. In 2007, Obasanjo commissioned a permanent site for the hospital.

References 

Teaching hospitals in Nigeria
1975 establishments in Nigeria